Margaret Cremen (born 5 January 1999) is an Irish rower. She competed in the women's lightweight double sculls event at the 2020 Summer Olympics.

References

External links
 
 Margaret Cremen at Rowing Ireland
 

1999 births
Living people
Irish female rowers
Olympic rowers of Ireland
Rowers at the 2020 Summer Olympics
Place of birth missing (living people)
World Rowing Championships medalists for Ireland